The American Society for Parenteral and Enteral Nutrition (ASPEN) is a US-based professional organization. Its members include dieticians, nurses, pharmacists, physicians and scientists who are involved in providing clinical nutrition to patients.

ASPEN was founded on June 5, 1975. It was officially incorporated on November 30, 1976. It has almost 6,000 members. The society runs an annual meeting, the ASPEN Nutrition Science & Practice Conference.

Journals 
Journal of Parenteral and Enteral Nutrition
Nutrition in Clinical Practice

Publications
The ASPEN Adult Nutrition Support Core Curriculum, 3rd Edition
ASPEN Fluids, Electrolytes, and Acid-Base Disorders Handbook, Second Edition
ASPEN Enteral Nutrition Handbook, 2nd Edition
ASPEN Parenteral Nutrition Handbook, Third Edition
Guidebook on Enteral Medication Administration

See also
Enteral administration
Feeding tube
National Board of Physician Nutrition Specialists
Parenteral nutrition

References

External links
 

Medical and health organizations based in Maryland
Nutrition organizations